Lechuza Caracas is a Venezuelan polo club owned by the Venezuelan Victor Vargas, owner of Banco Occidental de Descuento. 
Lechuza reached the final of the 2009 CV Whitney Cup. Lechuza also "reached the U.S. Open final in 2003, according to the North American Polo League Web site. The team twice won C.V. Whitney Cup, competed in the finals of the 2002 Gold Cup, and in 2007, finished runner-up in the U.S. Gold Cup and won the English Gold Cup."

Around 2015, Vargas had moved the headquarters of his club from England to Spain. When asked why, he explained the decision was simple: the rain. "We've played for five weeks here in Spain and had no rain."

In April 2009 21 Lechuza ponies died of a selenium overdose when a mineral supplement similar to Biodyl was wrongly mixed by a Florida pharmacy.

References

Sports organizations of Venezuela
Polo in Venezuela
Polo clubs